Simpson Memorial United Methodist Church may refer to:

Simpson Memorial United Methodist Church (Greenville, Indiana)
Simpson Memorial United Methodist Church (Charleston, West Virginia)